is a Japanese professional shogi player ranked 8-dan.

Iijima invented the Iijima Bishop Pullback strategy which is named after him. He received the 16th Masuda Award (April 2009March 2010) for developing the strategy.

Promotion history
Iijima's promotion history is as follows:
 6-kyū: 1991
 1-dan: 1995
 4-dan: April 1, 2000
 5-dan: September 7, 2004
 6-dan: September 11, 2008
 7-dan: October 22, 2010
 8-dan: February 2, 2021

References

External links
ShogiHub: Professional Player Info · Iijima, Eiji

1979 births
Japanese shogi players
Living people
Professional shogi players
Professional shogi players from Tokyo
Recipients of the Kōzō Masuda Award
People from Nakano, Tokyo